FabricLive.32 is a DJ mix compilation album by Tayo, as part of the FabricLive Mix Series.

Track listing
  2 tracks mixed:
  Tayo Meets Acid Rockers - Dread Cowboy - Tayo
  Loot and Pillage - The Curse - Dan Feary
  Ursula 1000 feat. Sista Widey - Step Back (Deekline Remix) - ESL
  Tayo and Undersound feat. Edu K - Putaria Toda Hora - Edu K
  Blaqstarr - Tote It - Mad Decent
  Sterotyp Meets Al' Haca - Blaz n Cook (Radio Slave Remix) - Klein
  Buraka Som Sistema - Com Reispeito - Enchufada
  Aquasky feat. Ragga Twins - Ready For This (Baobinga Mix) - Passenger
  Tayo meets Baobinga - Choppa Riddim - Roots & Future
  Bassbin Twins - Woppa - Bassbin
  Si Begg - Move Up (Club Mix) - Mute/EMI
  Tipper - Open The Jowls - Tippermusic
  Buckfunk 3000 - Jump - Si Begg
  Benga - Comb 60's - Planet Mu
  Tayo and Care In The Community - Dutty Bomb - Tayo
  Marc Adamo - Vicious Exit - Marc Adamo/Local Zeros 2006
  Elemental - Soul Fire - Destructive
  Sarantis feat. Warrior Queen - More Than Money - Senseless
  Skream - Lightning - Tempa
  Digital Mystikz - Neverland - DMZ
  Rob Smith - Loveage - Rob Smith
  Digital Mystikz - Anti War Dub feat. Spen G - DMZ

External links
Fabric: FabricLive.32

Fabric (club) albums
Tayo Popoola albums
2007 compilation albums